Zbigniew Jaremski (19 June 1949 – 3 January 2011) was a Polish sprinter, who specialized in the 400 m.

Career
Jaremski was born in Zabrze and represented the club Górnik Zabrze. He competed in 400 m at the 1972 and 1976 Summer Olympics, reaching the quarter-finals both times. In the 4 × 400 m relay he finished fifth with the Polish team at the 1972 Olympic Games. He then won the silver medal at the 1976 Olympic Games with his teammates Ryszard Podlas, Jan Werner and Jerzy Pietrzyk.

Jaremski became Polish champion in the 400 m in 1972, 1973 and 1975.

References

1949 births
2011 deaths
Polish male sprinters
Olympic silver medalists for Poland
Athletes (track and field) at the 1972 Summer Olympics
Athletes (track and field) at the 1976 Summer Olympics
Olympic athletes of Poland
European Athletics Championships medalists
Sportspeople from Zabrze
Medalists at the 1976 Summer Olympics
Olympic silver medalists in athletics (track and field)